P.Rathinavelu Thevar (1888–1948) was an Indian politician who served the Chairperson of the Trichinopoly Municipality from 1924 to 1946. He  was the Vice-President of the Justice Party, before joining the Indian National Congress.

References 

 

1888 births
Politicians from Tiruchirappalli
1948 deaths
Indian National Congress politicians from Tamil Nadu